The Clie NR were a series of handheld personal digital assistants (PDAs) made by Sony, announced in March 2002. These devices were distinctive, due a folding "Flip-and-Rotate" clamshell design, with a vertical rotatable screen.

Models

PEG-NR70 
The Clié PEG-NR70 was a Personal Digital Assistant (PDA) made by Sony. The device ran Palm OS (version 4.1) and featured a color display, thumb-sized keyboard and MP3/Atrac3 playback with a built-in speaker; features which were uncommon among other PDAs of its time.

Specifications

Palm OS: 4.1
CPU: Motorola 66 MHz MC68SZ328
Memory: 16 MB DRAM
Display: 320 x 480, 16bit Color
Sound: Internal audio amplifier and speaker, Headphone out.
External Connectors: USB
Expansion: Memory Stick
Wireless: Infrared
Battery: Rechargeable Li-Ion
Size & Weight: 7 oz
Colour: Silver

PEG-NR70V 
Otherwise identical to the NR70, the NR70V added a 0.1MP (320x240 pixel) stills camera to the device.

See also
Sony CLIÉ NX Series: The NX series succeeds the NR series.
Nokia N93, a cellphone with similar form factor

References

External links
  Detailed Specifications of the PEG-NR70
  SMUP Review of the PEG-NR70

Sony CLIÉ